Upper Providence Township is a township in Montgomery County, Pennsylvania, United States.  As of the 2010 census, the township population was 21,219.

History 

William Penn
originally owned the land that is now Upper Providence.  After selling off most of the land, he kept a large tract on the east side of the Schuylkill River, which included Upper and Lower Providence and parts of Perkiomen and Worcester.  William Penn named the land “The Manor of Gilberts” after his mother's maiden name.

The first
person to settle in this area was Edward Lane, who bought 2,500 acres of land from William Penn in 1701.  Edward and his wife established the Episcopal church in Lower Providence.  In 1717 John Jacob Schrack came to the
township from Germany.  Schrack was able to convince Rev. Henry Melchior Muhlenberg to relocate to this area.   Muhlenberg was the founder of the Lutheran church in the United States.  The first of which was founded in Trappe.

In March 1725 the farmers living on this land petitioned to form a new township called Providence.  This land included Upper and Lower Providence.

Upper Providence Township was established in 1805 by the division of the former Providence Township along the Perkiomen Creek.  In 1896, the Boroughs of Collegeville and Trappe were created from northeastern portions of the township, yielding the present township boundaries.

Schuylkill Canal 
The
Schuylkill canal was built to help navigate past rapids on the Schuylkill River between Norristown and Pottstown.  It was completed in 1825 and was approximately five miles long, extending from Black Rock dam (Lock 60) to Pawlings dam at the Perkiomen creek in Oaks (Lock 61).  In the 1830s, Lock 60 was doubled in size and in the 1840s, the locks were expanded to handle wider boats.

The river traffic helped the surrounding area grow. The settlement of Quincyville started at Lock 60 and the settlement of Lumberville grew at Lock 61.   Lumberville thrived with stables for mules, and a general store for boat supplies.  In the 1840s, these towns changed names, with Quincyville becoming Mont Clare and Lunberville becoming Port Providence, which are their current names.

With the ascendancy of railroads in the mid 19th century, boat traffic diminished.  However, it was supplemented by recreational  boating in the 1920s.  Pleasure boats ran between Philadelphia and Reading.  In the 1950s, the Army Corps of Engineers dredged the Schuylkill River to remove coal silt from upriver.  The lower part of the canal was used as a holding basin for the silt.

Railroads 
The Philadelphia
and Reading railroad ran through Upper Providence taking passengers from Philadelphia and Norristown to Pottstown, Reading and finally Pottsville.  Before the railroad this trip had to be taken on stagecoaches or by horse. The railroad was constructed starting in Reading and down to Pottstown  which opened in 1939.  The last section between Bridgeport and Philadelphia was completed in 1842. This
rail line is still in use for freight only.

The
Perkiomen Railroad was a second railroad passed through Upper Providence
running from Oaks to Collegeville and then to Allentown.  It was opened in 1868.  This railroad was closed and it now part of
the Perkiomen trail converted through the Rails to Trails initiative.

The Black Rock Bridge and Schuylkill Navigation Canal, Oakes Reach Section were listed on the National Register of Historic Places in 1988.

Geography
According to the United States Census Bureau, the township has a total area of 18.2 square miles (47.2 km2), of which 17.8 square miles (46.2 km2)  is land and 0.4 square mile (1.0 km2)  (2.09%) is water.  Upper Providence is bordered to the northwest by Royersford Borough and Limerick Township; to the northeast by Perkiomen Township, Trappe Borough, and Collegeville Borough; to the southeast, separated by the Perkiomen Creek, is Lower Providence Township; and to the southwest, separated by the Schuylkill River, is Chester County.

Demographics

As of the 2010 census, the township was 86.6% White, 3.5% Black or African American, 0.1% Native American, 7.9% Asian, and 1.5% were two or more races. 2.2% of the population were of Hispanic or Latino ancestry.

As of the census of 2000, there were 15,398 people, 5,355 households, and 4,101 families residing in the township.  The population density was 862.9 people per square mile (333.3/km2).  There were 5,545 housing units at an average density of 310.7/sq mi (120.0/km2).  The racial makeup of the township was 93.51% White, 2.57% African American, 0.10% Native American, 2.77% Asian, 0.03% Pacific Islander, 0.27% from other races, and 0.76% from two or more races. Hispanic or Latino of any race were 1.34% of the population.

There were 5,355 households, out of which 42.2% had children under the age of 18 living with them, 65.6% were married couples living together, 8.4% had a female householder with no husband present, and 23.4% were non-families. 18.7% of all households were made up of individuals, and 4.1% had someone living alone who was 65 years of age or older.  The average household size was 2.77 and the average family size was 3.20.

In the township the population was spread out, with 28.1% under the age of 18, 4.8% from 18 to 24, 37.5% from 25 to 44, 19.7% from 45 to 64, and 9.9% who were 65 years of age or older.  The median age was 35 years. For every 100 females there were 90.8 males.  For every 100 females age 18 and over, there were 87.4 males.

The median income for a household in the township was $75,789, and the median income for a family was $85,660. Males had a median income of $54,764 versus $37,193 for females. The per capita income for the township was $31,251.  About 1.1% of families and 1.5% of the population were below the poverty line, including 1.6% of those under age 18 and 0.7% of those age 65 or over.

Government and politics

Upper Providence Township elects three supervisors at-large. The November 8, 2016 ballot included a question for residents on whether or not the Board-of-Supervisors should be expanded to a total of five members, providing a better representation of the township's rapidly expanding population and demographics. The results of the ballot question are: YES – 4,560 (51%) and NO – 4,382 (49%)  resulting in the Board-of-Supervisors being expanded to five members.
Helene Calci, Chair
Albert Vagnozzi, Vice-Chair
John Pearson, Supervisor
Bill Starling, Supervisor
Laurie Higgins, Supervisor

Communities 
The following are unincorporated communities within Upper Providence.

 Arcola
 Mingo
 Mont Clare
 Oaks
 Port Providence
 Yerkes

Transportation

U.S. Route 422 is the main highway serving Upper Providence Township. It traverses the township via the Pottstown Expressway on a northwest-to-southeast alignment. Pennsylvania Route 29 and Pennsylvania Route 113 also traverse the township, following parallel northeast-to-southwest alignments across the central portion of the township.

SEPTA provides Suburban Bus service to Upper Providence Township along Route 93, which runs between the Norristown Transportation Center in Norristown and Pottstown, Route 99, which runs between the Norristown Transportation Center and Phoenixville, and Route 139, which runs between the King of Prussia Transit Center at the King of Prussia mall and Limerick.

Education
Upper Providence Township is a member of the Spring-Ford Area School District.

Economy
The Providence Town Center, an open-air lifestyle center, is located in Upper Providence Township at the interchange between U.S. Route 422 and Pennsylvania Route 29.

References

External links

 Upper Providence Township (official website)
 Upper Providence Township, CHAPTER LXXII, BEAN'S  HISTORY OF MONTGOMERY COUNTY, PENNSYLVANIA, 1884
 1871 Map of Upper Providence Township

Townships in Montgomery County, Pennsylvania